
Gmina Długosiodło is a rural gmina (administrative district) in Wyszków County, Masovian Voivodeship, in east-central Poland.

Villages
Gmina Długosiodło contains the villages and settlements of Adamowo, Augustowo, Blochy, Budy-Przetycz, Chorchosy, Chrzczanka Włościańska, Chrzczanka-Folwark, Dalekie, Dębienica, Długosiodło, Grądy Szlacheckie, Grądy Zalewne, Jaszczułty, Kalinowo, Kornaciska, Łączka, Lipniak-Majorat, Małaszek, Marianowo, Nowa Pecyna, Nowa Wieś, Nowe Bosewo, Olszaki, Ostrykół Dworski, Ostrykół Włościański, Plewki, Prabuty, Przetycz Włościańska, Przetycz-Folwark, Sieczychy, Stara Pecyna, Stare Bosewo, Stare Suski, Stasin, Wólka Grochowa, Wólka Piaseczna, Zalas, Zamość, Znamiączki and Zygmuntowo.

Neighbouring gminas
Gmina Długosiodło is bordered by the gminas of Brańszczyk, Goworowo, Ostrów Mazowiecka, Rząśnik, Rzewnie and Wąsewo.

References

Polish official population figures 2006

Dlugosiodlo
Wyszków County